The Tübingen University Faculty of Law, located in Tübingen, Germany, is one of the original four constituent faculties of Eberhard Karls Universität Tübingen. Founded in 1477 by Eberhard I, Duke of Württemberg, it is one of the oldest law schools in Germany.

References

External links
 Tübingen University Faculty of Law
 Introduction to the Faculties

University of Tübingen
Tübingen
1470s establishments in the Holy Roman Empire
1477 establishments in Europe
Law schools in Germany